Thelypteris (maiden ferns) is a genus of ferns in the subfamily Thelypteridoideae, family Thelypteridaceae, order Polypodiales. Two radically different circumscriptions of the genus are in use . In the Pteridophyte Phylogeny Group classification of 2016 (PPG I), the genus is a very small one with about two species. In other approaches, the genus is the only one in the subfamily Thelypteridoideae, and so includes between 875 and 1083 species.

The genus name is from Greek thēlys "female" and pteris "fern". However, "female fern" usually refers to the common lady-fern.

Taxonomy 
At one time, all thelypterioid ferns were included in the genus Dryopteris because of the sorus shape.  However, there are a great many differences between the groups, and these plants are now segregated in their own family.

Some researchers include the entire family Thelypteridaceae in the genus Thelypteris. An intermediate position is to place the bulk in Thelypteris (corresponding to Thelypterioideae of PPG I), which can then be divided into subgenera and sections corresponding to the genera of other authors, but to separate out Phegopteris and Macrothelypteris. Another choice is to divide the family into many genera, one of which is Thelypteris. This is the approach taken in the Pteridophyte Phylogeny Group classification of 2016 (PPG I).

Species 
Using the circumscription of the genus in PPG I, the Checklist of Ferns and Lycophytes of the World accepted three species:
Thelypteris confluens (Thunb.) C.V.Morton
Thelypteris krayanensis K.Iwats. & M.Kato
Thelypteris palustris (Salisb.) Schott

Other sources place the entire subfamily Thelypteridoideae in the genus, and so accept many more species, including the following (synonyms from the Checklist of Ferns and Lycophytes of the World):
 Thelypteris aculeata A.R.Sm. = Amauropelta aculeata
 Thelypteris appressa A.R.Sm. = Amauropelta appressa
 Thelypteris bonapartii (Rosenst.) Alston = Amauropelta bonapartii
 Thelypteris campii A.R.Sm. = Amauropelta campii
 Thelypteris chimboracensis A.R.Sm. = Amauropelta chimboracensis
 Thelypteris conformis (Sodiro) A.R.Sm. = Amauropelta conformis
 Thelypteris correllii A.R.Sm. = Amauropelta correllii
 Thelypteris dodsonii A.R.Sm. = Amauropelta dodsonii
 Thelypteris elegantula (Sodiro) Alston = Amauropelta elegantula
 Thelypteris euthythrix A.R.Sm. = Amauropelta euthythrix
 Thelypteris fluminalis A.R.Sm. = Amauropelta fluminalis
 Thelypteris inabonensis Proctor = Amauropelta inabonensis
 Thelypteris kunthii (Desv.) Morton = Christella normalis
 Thelypteris macra A.R.Sm. = Amauropelta macra
 Thelypteris nevadensis (Baker) Clute ex Morton = Parathelypteris nevadensis
 Thelypteris noveboracensis (L.) Nieuwl. = Parathelypteris noveboracensis
 Thelypteris pilosa (M.Martens & Galeotti) Crawford = Stegnogramma pilosa
 Thelypteris puberula (Baker) Morton = Christella puberula
 Thelypteris rosenstockii (C.Chr.) R.M.Tryon = Amauropelta rosenstockii 
 Thelypteris semilunata (Sodiro) A.R.Sm. = Amauropelta semilunata 
 Thelypteris simulata (Davenport) Nieuwl. = Coryphopteris simulata
 Thelypteris subtilis A.R.Sm. = Amauropelta subtilis 
 Thelypteris verecunda Proctor = Goniopteris verecunda
 Thelypteris yaucoensis Proctor = Goniopteris yaucoensis

References

Thelypteridaceae
Fern genera
Taxonomy articles created by Polbot